James Harmon Chadbourn (born Spartanburg, South Carolina, 1905; died, Cambridge, Massachusetts, 1982) was an American legal scholar and an expert in civil procedure, Federal jurisdiction and evidence. He was a Fessenden Professor of law at Harvard University from 1963 until his retirement in 1974.

Education
Chadbourn received a B.A. from The Citadel, The Military College of South Carolina in 1926.He received an LL.B. from the University of North Carolina at Chapel Hill School of Law in 1931.

Employment
Assistant Professor & ---, University of North Carolina School of Law, 19-- - 19--
Professor, University of Pennsylvania School of Law, 1940-1950
Professor, University of California at Los Angeles School of Law, 1950-1963
Visiting Professor, Harvard Law School, 1961-1963
Fessenden Professor of Law, Harvard Law School 1963-1974

Publications

Books, treatises, casebooks & reports:

Chadbourn revised seven volumes (turning them into eight) of the third edition of the classic treatise John H. Wigmore, Evidence in Trials at Common Law (3d ed. 1940).

J. Chabourn, Lynching and the Law (1933), reprinted in 2008 by the Lawbook Exchange, Ltd; 
T. Atkinson & J. Chadbourn, Cases and Other Materials on Civil Procedure (1948);
T. Atkinson & J. Chadbourn, Introduction to Civil Procedure (1948); 
J. Chadbourn, L. Levin & P. Shuchman, Cases and Materials on Civil Procedure (2d ed. 1974) (original edition published by Chadbourn and Levin in 1961); 
R. Magill & J. Chadbourn, Cases and Civil Procedure Preface (3d ed. 1939); 
J. Chadbourn & L. Levin, Procedure Portfolio: Pleadings, Process and Appeal Papers in Facsimile (1962);
J. Chadbourn, H. Grossman & A. Van Alstyne, California Pleading -- Civil Actions (1961); 
J. Chadbourn, A. Van Alstyne & H. Grossman, California Discovery Practice (1972); 
C. McCormick, J. Chadbourn & C. Wright, Cases and Materials on Federal Courts (6th ed. 1976) (federal courts casebook first published by McCormick and Chadbourn in 1946); 
6 California Law Revision Commission Reports 39-45, 58-74, 133-69, 307-09, 328-416, 439-80, 509-25, 627-79, 727-71, 831-60, 925-50, 1049-107 (1964).

References

Albert M. Sacks, "In Memoriam: James H. Chadbourn,"  Harvard Law Review vol. 96 (Dec. 1982), no. 2, pp. 361–363
Jack B. Weinstein, "In Memoriam: Writings of James H. Chadbourn," Harvard Law Review, vol. 96 (Dec. 1982), no. 2, pp. 364–370
Eric Green, "In Memoriam: James H. Chadbourn," Harvard Law Review vol. 92 (Dec. 1982) pp. 371–373

1905 births
The Citadel, The Military College of South Carolina alumni
University of North Carolina School of Law alumni
University of North Carolina at Chapel Hill faculty
University of Pennsylvania faculty
UCLA School of Law faculty
Harvard Law School faculty
1982 deaths
20th-century American lawyers